Necrotizing bronchiolitis is an acute inflammatory lesion of the lower airway, a potential complication of mechanical ventilation.

References

Lesion